The Women's road race of the 2011 UCI Road World Championships cycling event took place on 24 September in Copenhagen, Denmark. The course were 10 laps over a 14 km circuit making 140 km.

Participating nations

Final classification
Of the race's 146 entrants, 120 riders completed the full distance.

References

Women's road race
UCI Road World Championships – Women's road race
2011 in women's road cycling